Waratah motorcycles were manufactured in Sydney, Australia, from before 1911 to around 1948, although Waratah badged motorcycles were sold into the 1950s.

Initially Waratah motorcycles were manufactured by the Canada Cycle & Motor Agency, Ltd. on George Street, Sydney, who from at least 1910 built from standard parts, or rebadged BSA bicycles as, Waratah bicycles. W.A.Williams had been the manager of the Sydney branch of this business and in 1905 he bought it, retaining the name until 1913. In 1913 the bicycle and motorcycle part of the business was taken over by his sons, Perce and Reg, and the name was changed to Williams Bros., and later P&R Williams. This business, initially at 213–7 Elizabeth Street, Sydney, is widely known as the manufacturer of Waratah motorcycles from 1914 to 1948. Subsequent addresses of 255-259 Elizabeth St by the early 1920s, and 117 Goulburn St in the later 1920s are detailed in newspaper advertising, also detailing that the business changed its name to P.and R. Williams Pty Ltd, and later moved to 74-78 Wentworth Avenue Surry Hills.

Initially, they made small machines assembled from predominantly British components, including Villiers engines, Sun frames, Druid and Brampton forks. In fact, in 1921 they described themselves as sole importers of Villiers-Waratah Motor-Cycles. Fafnir and V.T.S. engines were also used.

In the later years (post World War II), they badge engineered using, it is believed, Norman and Excelsior machines.

They were Australia's longest running motorcycle manufacturer. However little information seems to have survived, presumably because these were low-value utility machines.

Models
There is no detailed definitive history of the Waratah models, but from books, press articles, sales brochures and adverts, the following outline picture seems clear:
 <1911 to 1913?: 4.5 hp model with a Fafnir engine
 1914 to ~1930: 197 cc and 350 cc models, built from Villiers (and initially also V.T.S.) engines and various frames and forks.
 1930s: 125 cc, 148 cc and 250 cc models, built from Villiers engines and various frames and forks.
 post-war: Badge engineered Norman (possibly) and/or Excelsior (almost certainly). Possibly there was also a Waratah autocycle.

More details are known for certain years:

Historical events

Agents, Distributors, Etc,

Sources

External links
Australian Motorcycles – Waratah
Waratah Motorcycles

Defunct manufacturing companies of Australia
Motorcycle manufacturers of Australia
Australian companies established in 1911
Vehicle manufacturing companies established in 1911
Vehicle manufacturing companies disestablished in 1948
1948 disestablishments in Australia